In Canadian folklore, the Igopogo is a mythical creature said to dwell in Lake Simcoe, Ontario. The creature's name is ostensibly based on the Ogopogo, of Lake Okanagan, British Columbia, and also the title of the 1952 book I Go Pogo, a slogan often mentioned in the comic. Other nicknames for the Igopogo include Beaverton Bessie, after Beaverton, Ontario, and "Kempenfelt Kelly" after the bay that extends from the lake into the city of Barrie, Ontario. The city of Barrie erected a sculpture of the Igopogo at the waterfront.

Appearance 
E. J. Delaney, described it as a creature with two long antennae, four octopus-like arms, three pairs of legs, and six gill-like appendages with feathers.

Some writers have speculated based on this appearance that the sightings were actually of pinnipeds, such as otters or seals.

Alleged sightings 

David Soules, an early settler, is credited with the first alleged Igopogo sighting in 1823. While tending sheep, Soules reportedly saw a long creature leaving a wake in the water and a trail in the mud. Another major sighting took place in 1952 by four witnesses including Wellington Charles, chief of the Georgina Island First Nation. In 1983, sonar operator William W. Skrypetz reported spotting a large animal with a long neck, although some have disputed this account, claiming the reading could have instead been a school of fish. 

Other alleged sightings include reports in 1903 and 1906, and a 1991 video recording of "a large, seal-like animal." In 2016 John Kirk of the British Columbia Scientific Cryptozoology Club claimed on The Shirley Show to have a tape of the creature, though he did not show it.

See also
 Ogopogo, reported to live in Okanagan Lake, in British Columbia, Canada
 Manipogo, said to live in Lake Manitoba, Manitoba
 Memphre, said to live in Lake Memphremagog, Quebec
 Seelkee, said to live in the swamps of what is now Chilliwack, in British Columbia

References

Canadian folklore
Canadian legendary creatures
Water monsters
Lake Simcoe
Cryptids